Vangjeli is a surname. Notable people with the surname include:

Kosta Vangjeli (born 2000), Greek–born Albanian footballer
Kristi Vangjeli (born 1985), Albanian footballer
Vasillaq Vangjeli (1948–2011), Albanian actor and comedian

Albanian-language surnames